The McNair Mynah is a single seat single bay biplane microlight aircraft from New Zealand. There was also a two-seat version built, possibly about 1990.

Description
The Mynah was built in Auckland by Wallace McNair. It is designed to be reminiscent of the 1920s Lincoln Sports biplane that was popular in New Zealand. The Mynah has a 'fuselage' of two welded tubes designed to fold for transport.

At least six Mynahs were built.  As of 2013, three were still flying in New Zealand. The Mynahs were powered by various engines included Rotax 447 and 503. Those powered by a Kornatsu Zenoah 40 hp cruised at 50 mph and had a stall speed of 20 mph.

Registration numbers
The registration numbers known are:

Single seat
 ZK-FKI - MAANZ 303 - registered December 1984 - crashed at Taupiri 30 August 1986 
 ZK-FOA - MAANZ 382 - registered May 1987 - 
 ZK-FSR - 002 - was based at Rotorua - deregistered 4 June 2013
 ZK-FQU - 003 - MAANZ 403 - registered April 1988 - was based at Taupiri 
 ZK-FQV - 002 - MAANZ 404 - registered April 1988

Two seater
 ZK-FWT - 001 - MAANZ 450 - registered October 1990 - Skyflight Mynah 2

References

External links
McNair Mynah in flight
McNair Mynah @ Aeropedia

Aircraft manufactured in New Zealand